The men's team sabre was one of seven fencing events on the Fencing at the 1924 Summer Olympics programme. It was the fourth appearance of the event.

The competition was held from Friday July 12, 1924, to Monday July 15, 1924. 14 teams, composed of 80 fencers, competed.

Rosters

Results

Round 1

The top two teams in each pool advanced. Each team played each other team in its pool, unless a match was unnecessary to determine qualification. Each team match included 16 bouts: four fencers from one team faced four fencers from the other team once apiece. Bouts were to four touches.

Pool A

Pool B

Pool C

Pool D

Pool E

Quarterfinals

The top two teams in each pool advanced. Each team played each other team in its pool, unless a match was unnecessary to determine qualification. Each team match included 16 bouts: four fencers from one team faced four fencers from the other team once apiece. Bouts were to four touches.

Pool A

Italy beat Belgium on touches, 50 to 46.

Pool B

Pool C

France beat Czechoslovakia on touches, 49 to 43.

Semifinals

The top two teams in each pool advanced. Each team played each other team in its pool, unless the match was unnecessary to decide qualification. Each team match included 16 bouts: four fencers from one team faced four fencers from the other team once apiece. Bouts were to four touches.

Pool A

Czechoslovakia beat Argentina on touches, 47 to 45.

Pool B

Final

Each team played each other team. Each team match included 16 bouts: four fencers from one team faced four fencers from the other team once apiece. Bouts were to four touches. Italy beat Hungary on touches, 50 to 46, in a match that was the difference in the gold medal standings.

References

 
 

Sabre men team
Men's events at the 1924 Summer Olympics